Yo Takenaka (竹中 要 Takenaka Yō, 1903–1966) was a Japanese plant geneticist and a Professor of Department of Cell Genetics, National Institute of Genetics. He is notable for researching the phylogenetic classification of cherry blossom. He discovered that Prunus × yedoensis is a crossbreed of two wild species of Japanese cherry; Prunus spachiana forma ascendens (Edo higan) and Prunus speciosa (Oshima zakura) by crossing experiments. He was also known as a researcher on Japanese morning glory and Nicotiana.

Career
He was born in Hyōgo Prefecture, Japan in 1903. He graduated from the Department of Botany, Faculty of Science, Tokyo Imperial University in 1927. He was a Professor of Keijō Imperial University from 1929 to 1945. After the end of war, he became a Professor of National Institute of Genetics in 1949. He died on 18 March 1966 at the age of 62.

Works

See also
 Jeju flowering cherry

References

External links
 Home page of National Institute of Genetics

20th-century Japanese botanists
1903 births
1966 deaths